Dimmock v Hallett (1866–67) LR 2 Ch App 21 is an English contract law case, concerning misrepresentation.

Facts
An  estate was about to be auctioned off to discharge a debt to a mortgage. The estate included three parcels of land called "Bull Hassocks Farm", "Creyke's Hundreds" and "Misson Springs". The advertisement for the auction described the Bull Hassocks Farm as having "fertile and improvable land", and described in the particulars that each parcel was let out to paying tenants (the first two to Mr R Hickson and Misson Springs to a Mr F Wigglesworth). However, it was not mentioned that the tenants had, by the time of the auction, already given notice to quit the property. The eventual buyer, Mr Dimmock, sought rescission of the contract for misrepresentation (among a number of other grounds).

The 13th condition of sale also stated the following exclusion clause,

“If any mistake be made in the description of any of the lots, or any other error shall appear in the particulars of the estate (except as to the quantity of land, which shall be taken as stated, whether more or less), such mistake or error shall not annul the sale, but the vendor or purchaser shall give or take a compensation or equivalent as the case may require, and which compensation or equivalent shall be settled by the said Judge at Chambers.”

Judgment
The Court of Appeal held that although the statement about the land being "fertile and improvable" was merely a "flourishing description" and did not entitle the buyer to rescind, telling only a half truth about the tenants constituted good grounds for unwinding the contracts. Sir GJ Turner LJ gave judgment first.

Sir HM Cairns LJ

See also
Misrepresentation in English law

Notes

English misrepresentation case law
1866 in case law
1866 in British law
Court of Chancery cases